Sparta Township may refer to:

Illinois
 Sparta Township, Knox County, Illinois

Indiana
 Sparta Township, Dearborn County, Indiana
 Sparta Township, Noble County, Indiana

Michigan
 Sparta Township, Michigan

Minnesota
 Sparta Township, Minnesota

Missouri
 Sparta Township, Christian County, Missouri, in Christian County, Missouri

Nebraska
 Sparta Township, Knox County, Nebraska

New Jersey
 Sparta Township, New Jersey

Pennsylvania
 Sparta Township, Pennsylvania

See also
 Sparta (disambiguation)

Township name disambiguation pages